Etten is a village in the Dutch province of Gelderland. It is located in the municipality of Oude IJsselstreek, 7 km southeast of Doetinchem.

Etten was a separate municipality until 1818, when it was merged with Gendringen.

History 
It was first mentioned around 1200 as de Ettene. The etymology in clear. The village started on a river dune along the Oude IJssel. The Dutch Reformed Church dates from the 15th century. The tower has 11th century elements. Castle Schuylenburgh was a medieval castle. It was bombed twice during World War II, and later demolished. In 1840, it was home to 292 people.

Gallery

References

Populated places in Gelderland
Former municipalities of Gelderland
Oude IJsselstreek